Jodocus de Weerdt (Josse van Weerdt, ca. 1555-1560 in Antwerp – August 4 or 5, 1625) was a Belgian author of Neo-Latin poetry. He is remembered for the two strange collections of Latin chronograms, palindromes, acrostics, anagrams, and tautograms that are listed below. The first celebrates the Twelve Years' Truce, while the second, which appeared posthumously, covers political events in Europe from 1621 to 1625.

Life
Josse de Weerdt was born in Antwerp. After studying law in Cologne, by 1609 he had become syndic of Antwerp. Little else is known of his life. He is said to be buried in the Franciscan monastery in Antwerp.

Works
 
  The prior book reprints a lightly revised text of the 1609 Panegyricus.

References

1625 deaths
Writers from Antwerp